The 2016 Sofia Open (also known as 2016 Garanti Koza Sofia Open for sponsorship reasons) was a men's tennis tournament played on indoor hard courts. It was the 1st edition of the Sofia Open as part of the ATP World Tour 250 series of the 2016 ATP World Tour. It took place at the Arena Armeec in Sofia, Bulgaria, from February 1–7.

Points and prize money

Point distribution

Prize money

Singles main-draw entrants

Seeds

1 Rankings were as of January 18, 2016

Other entrants
The following players received wildcards into the singles main draw:
  Marsel İlhan
  Dimitar Kuzmanov
  Alexandar Lazov

The following players received entry from the qualifying draw:
  Mirza Bašić
  Daniel Brands
  Marius Copil
  Thomas Fabbiano

Withdrawals
Before the tournament
  Simone Bolelli →replaced by  Thiemo de Bakker
  Janko Tipsarević →replaced by  Filip Krajinović
During the tournament
  Filip Krajinović (right shoulder injury)

Doubles main-draw entrants

Seeds

1 Rankings were as of January 18, 2016

Other entrants
The following pairs received wildcards into the doubles main draw:
  Tuna Altuna /  Konstantin Kravchuk
  Dimitar Kuzmanov /  Alexandar Lazov

Champions

Singles 

  Roberto Bautista Agut def.  Viktor Troicki 6–3, 6–4

Doubles 

  Wesley Koolhof /  Matwé Middelkoop def.  Philipp Oswald /  Adil Shamasdin 5–7, 7–6(11–9), [10–6]

External links 
Official website

Sofia Open
Sofia Open
Sofia Open